Camden Square is a rectangular town square in the London Borough of Camden running parallel to Camden Road north of central Camden. It has a playground and dog walking area, and St Paul's Church is at the north end. At the south end is the London Irish Centre, which has served the boroughs' Irish community for over sixty years.

Notable residents

Amy Winehouse and Orlando Jewitt both lived and died on the square, and one of its houses once housed the West African Students' Union. Indian politician V. K. Krishna Menon lived in a house there from 1924 to 1947. In May 2012, the property where Winehouse lived and died was put on the market for £2.7 million after her family decided it was inappropriate to live there. Currently the area directly opposite the singer's former house is used as a shrine with gifts and letters left by fans around the trees and the fence to the square. In the years since her death, at least fourteen 'Camden Square' street signs have been stolen by fans seeking memorabilia, which has cost Camden Borough Council over £4000 to replace.

Many artists have lived in the square. The most notable are probably Sir Lawrence Alma-Tadema OM, RA, who lived briefly at no 4 in 1871, and the sculptor William Turnbull. For the period 1851 to 1901 seventy-five artists have been identified living in the square or nearby

References

External links
 

Squares in the London Borough of Camden
Garden squares in London
Amy Winehouse